Almer is a village in Dorset, England.

Almer may also refer to:

Almer (surname)
Almer Township, Michigan, US

See also

 Almere (disambiguation)
Aylmer (disambiguation)
Almir (given name)